Fond du Lac 233 is an Indian reserve of the Fond du Lac Denesuline First Nation in Saskatchewan.

References

Indian reserves in Saskatchewan
Division No. 18, Saskatchewan